Magalie Pottier (born 16 March 1989 in Vallet) is a French racing cyclist who represents France in BMX. She was selected to represent France at the 2012 Summer Olympics in the women's BMX event and finished in seventh place.

Pottier is coached by Fabrice Vettoretti. In 2012, she won both the French and world BMX championships, giving her a total of seven French championships, eleven European championships and seven world championships. She won the World Junior Championship in 2007. She began competing in BMX in 1996 as a 7 year old and was France's reserve rider for the 2008 Olympics. In June 2015, she competed in the inaugural European Games, for France in cycling, more specifically, Women's BMX. She earned a silver medal.

References

External links
 
 
 
 

1989 births
Living people
BMX riders
French female cyclists
Olympic cyclists of France
Cyclists at the 2012 Summer Olympics
European Games medalists in cycling
European Games silver medalists for France
Cyclists at the 2015 European Games
UCI BMX World Champions (elite women)
Cyclists from Loire-Atlantique
21st-century French women